Back to 1989 is a 2016 Taiwanese fantasy, romance, comedy television series produced by Sanlih E-Television. It is adaptation from Huang Xin Jie's (一念間) who won the 6th Television Scriptwriting Award for creative popularity award held by Bureau of Audiovisual and Music Industry Development. Filming began on December 28, 2015 and wrapped up on May 30, 2016. First original broadcast began on January 22, 2016 on SET Metro airing every Friday night at 10:00-11:30 pm.

Synopsis
Chen Che doesn't know who his father was and the topic is a taboo in the Chen family. When an accident threw him back to 1989, a year before he was born, he gets a chance to find out himself. Before he could locate his mother, he first meets her best friend, Ye Zhen Zhen, a wholesome girl who helps him navigate the past while he helps her land big clients with his expert knowledge of stock market trend. Through her, he gets to know his younger, happier "mom" and the possible candidates for his father. He soon learns the reason his mother never talks about his father, and he is faced with a dilemma: He must choose between his mother's future and his very existence.

Cast

Main cast
Marcus Chang as Chen Che 
Liao Bai Xun as Chen Che (3 years old)
Ceng Bai Wai as Chen Che (7 years old)
Ivy Shao as Ye Zhen Zhen 
Mini Tsai as Chen Ya Juan 
Yorke Sun as Li Jin Qin 
 as Lin Xiao Long 
 as Wang Zhong En

Supporting cast
 as Zhang Wan Ling
 as Chen Guo Zhang 
 as Huang Bao Yu 
 as Ye Qing Xiong 
 as Jian Zhen Hua 
 as Hu Li Jing 
Liu Jin Wei as Ye Guo An 
 as adult Guo An
 as Zhao Zhi Cheng 
Guo Pei Yu as Ah Wei 
Xu Shao Fen as Xiao Qian 
 as Guo Sheng Tai

Cameos
Lu Fu Ling as Wu Xiao Li （Lily Wu）
Bamboo Chen as General Manager Tian 
Jian Yi Zhe as Li Da Zhong 
 as President Wang
Xia Yi Li as Chief Editor Zhang
Lin Shi En as Zhang Shun Fa 
Lai Meng Jun as Liu Shu Hui 
Xie Fei as Shun Fa and Shu Hui's son
Lan Jing Heng as David
 as Jin Qin's father
Tong Yi Jun as psychic

Soundtrack

 Back to 1989 Original TV Soundtrack (OST) (1989一念間 電視原聲帶) was released on January 22, 2016 by various artists under Rock Records. It contains 12 tracks total, in which 6 songs are various instrumental versions of the songs. The opening theme "A Friend 我們是朋友" by Gary Chaw 曹格 is not featured on the official soundtrack CD. The closing theme is track 1 "Two People 兩個人" by Alien Huang 黃鴻升.

Track listing

Songs not featured on the official soundtrack album.
A Friend 我們是朋友 by Gary Chaw 曹格
Little 小小 by Gary Chaw 曹格
Life Is Beautiful 美麗人生 by Gary Chaw 曹格
I'm From A Star 我來自那顆星 by Alien Huang 黃鴻升
Fell In Love With You 愛上你 by Wendy Chen
Moving On 單身≠失戀 by Shi Shi 孫盛希

Broadcast

Episode ratings
Competing dramas on rival channels airing at the same time slot were:
FTV - Justice Heroes, My Teacher Is Xiao-he
STAR Chinese Channel - Golden Darling
SET Taiwan - La Grande Chaumiere Violette
TTV - Shia Wa Se, Life List

: The average rating calculation does not include special episode.

Awards and nominations

References

External links
Back to 1989 SETTV Website 
Back to 1989 SETTV New Website 
Back to 1989 EBC Website  
 

2016 Taiwanese television series debuts
2016 Taiwanese television series endings
Taiwanese time travel television series
Sanlih E-Television original programming
Eastern Television original programming
Television series set in 1989
Television series set in 2016